Hemidoras is a small genus of thorny catfishes native to the Amazon basin in South America.

Species 
There are currently two recognized species in this genus:
 Hemidoras morrisi C. H. Eigenmann, 1925
 Hemidoras stenopeltis (Kner, 1855)

References

Doradidae
Fish of South America
Catfish genera
Taxa named by Pieter Bleeker
Freshwater fish genera